The Order of Malta Ireland – Ambulance Corps is a voluntary ambulance and first aid organisation operating in Ireland in affiliation with the Sovereign Military Order of Malta, founded in 1938.

Its purposes include teaching first aid, providing ambulance cover at large events, medical aid, patient transport, and community and nursing services. The Sovereign Military Order of Malta has over 5,000 volunteers throughout the island of Ireland. Its headquarters are located in Saint John House, 32 Clyde Road, Ballsbridge, Dublin 4, Ireland.

History 
The first unit of the Order of Malta Ambulance Corps was founded in 1938, when Conor O'Malley, a Galway doctor, was asked by Marquis McSweeney, the then chancellor of the Irish Association, to recruit members to form an ambulance corps, aimed initially for Connaught only.

Thirteen men were recruited by Professor O'Malley: six sixth year students from St. Josephs College "the Bish", Secondary School; four members from C.Y.M.S., Galway ; two Scout Masters; and one "lay" member. These thirteen members were the founding members of the ambulance corps in Galway.

The new recruits were enrolled on a series of First Aid lectures, given by Professor O'Malley in the X-Ray Department of the Central Hospital . The bandaging was taught by Theatre Sister Mary Shaughnessy. Examinations in First Aid were held in January
1938 and all were successful. In February 1938 First Aid services were requested for a National League match in Castlebar. The duties were allocated in alphabetical order meaning "Burke" and "Coogan" were first on duty.

The first Officer in Charge of the Galway Unit was Sgt. Timothy Murphy. A second unit was set up in 1939 in Kilkenny and since then the Ambulance Corps has grown in strength providing First Aid cover for many major sporting and cultural events and concerts.

Modern organisation 
The Ambulance Corps is a national organisation with 5,346 members involved in 86 units across the Island of Ireland. For administration purposes, the country is divided into regions which are managed by regional directors.

Each region consists of a number of units which deliver services at local level. The organisation operates over 170 ambulances, mobile accident and emergency suites, support vehicles, medical response bikes, Rapid Response Vehicles (RRVs) and mobile command and control centres. The Ambulance Corps uses the TETRA Radio system in line with the statutory emergency services in Ireland.

The organisations headquarters are located in St John's House Clyde Road, Ballsbridge, Dublin 4. Within the building there are modern lecture halls for training and a command and control centre to coordinate vehicles and personnel in the event of major incidents.

Through their youth section, Order of Malta Cadets accommodates children aged 10–16 years. Cadets are trained in basic life saving skills: first aid, CPR and assisting with activities of daily living.

The organisation provides a full program of youth development and sporting activities for young people and encourages them to continue developing their citizenship skills. Additionally, cadets are involved in the community helping the elderly and disabled both locally and internationally.

The ambulance corps coordinate a range of community care services including day care centres, community care centres and centres for older people. They also provide essential respite for young disabled people at their purpose facilities in the Share Holiday Village.

The ambulance corps assist pilgrims to Knock, Croagh Patrick and Lourdes annually.

Order of Malta Ireland is a registered as a charity in the Republic of Ireland as Malta Charities, CHY4538. Malta Charities is accepted as a charity in Northern Ireland by HMRC under reference XR40765.

Senior members 
The national director of the Order of Malta Ambulance Corps is Comdr. John Wright, KM. In common with all members of the Ambulance Corps, Wright is a volunteer. He is assisted by two Deputy Directors, David Birchall KM and Brian Coote KM, Chief Medical Officer Dr. Lisa Cunningham DM, and a staff with responsibility for different areas of ambulance corps work.

The president of the Irish Association of the Sovereign Military Order of Malta is Richard Duc de Stacpoole, KM, who succeeded Sir Adrian FitzGerald, Bt., the Knight of Kerry, KM.

Ranks 
Cadet ranks (ages 10–16)
 Cadet (Red Epaulette with Maltese Cross and "Cadet" written below)
 Cadet Corporal (Two lines on jumper sleeve and Epaulette)
 Cadet Sergeant (Three lines on jumper sleeve and Epaulette)

Adult ranks (ages 16+)
 Volunteer

Non-commissioned officers ranks
 Corporal (two downward chevrons)
 Sergeant (three downward chevrons)
 Adjutant (three downward chevrons and a gold Malteser pip)

Commissioned officers ranks
 Second Lieutenant
 First Lieutenant
 Captain
 Commandant
 Assistant Commander
 Commander
 Assistant National Director
 Deputy National Director
 National Director

Volunteers wear epaulettes with a Maltese Cross while members holding a rank wear an epaulette with the Maltese Cross plus rank markings on the shoulders of the uniform. Different colour epaulettes are used to denote various medical qualifications and if a member is a member of the Catholic clergy.
 Red for members trained as cardiac first responders, First Aid Responders, Emergency First Responders and Green Emergency Medical Technicians
 Green for paramedic and Advanced Paramedic
 Blue for nurse
 Red for Medical Physician Doctor 
 Grey marked with a red tip and bottom indicate the member is under 18 years of age (Introduced in late 2011)
 Black for member of the Clergy. Clergy are also granted the commissioned rank of Captain as displayed on epaulettes of uniform.

National organisation 
The Order of Malta Ambulance Corps aims to have at least one unit based in every county in Ireland. The island of Ireland is divided into nine regions, each region administered by a regional director.

Regions and units 
The island of Ireland is divided into nine regions, each with an appointed regionaldirector who reports directly to the Deputy National Director. The regions are:

Northern Region
Antrim, Armagh, Down, Fermanagh, Tyrone and Derry

North Western Region
Mayo, Sligo & Leitrim. (Currently have there are no units in Donegal)

Western Region
Galway and Roscommon

South Western Region
Clare, Limerick, Cork and Kerry

South Eastern Region
Carlow, Kilkenny, Waterford, and Wexford

Eastern Region
 Dublin and Wicklow

Midlands Region
Tipperary, Westmeath, Offaly, Longford, Laois and Kildare

North Eastern Region
Louth and Meath (Currently there are no units in Cavan and Monaghan)

See also 
 Sovereign Military Order of Malta
 Orders, decorations, and medals of the Sovereign Military Order of Malta
 St John Ambulance Ireland

References

Further reading 
 Patrick Levaye, Géopolitique du Catholicisme (Éditions Ellipses, 2007)

External links 

 Order of Malta Ambulance Corps - official website
 Official site of the Sovereign Military Order of Malta
 Order of Malta British Association and English Priory
 Maltese Association of the Order Of Malta
 A Research Website on the Orders of St John

Sovereign Military Order of Malta
Ambulance services in Ireland
Health charities
First aid organizations
Charities based in the Republic of Ireland